Scientists trying to reconstruct evolutionary history have been challenged by the fact that genes can sometimes transfer between distant branches on the tree of life. This movement of genes can occur through horizontal gene transfer (HGT), scrambling the information on which biologists relied to reconstruct the phylogeny of organisms. Conversely, HGT can also help scientists to reconstruct and date the tree of life. Indeed, a gene transfer can be used as a phylogenetic marker, or as the proof of contemporaneity of the donor and recipient organisms, and as a trace of extinct biodiversity.

HGT happens very infrequently – at the individual organism level, it is highly improbable for any such event to take place. However, on the grander scale of evolutionary history, these events occur with some regularity. On one hand, this forces biologists to abandon the use of individual genes as good markers for the history of life. On the other hand, this provides an almost unexploited large source of information about the past.

Three domains of life 

The three main early branches of the tree of life have been intensively studied by microbiologists because the first organisms were microorganisms. Microbiologists (led by Carl Woese) have introduced the term domain for the three main branches of this tree, where domain is  a phylogenetic term similar in meaning to biological kingdom. To reconstruct this tree of life, the gene sequence encoding the small subunit of ribosomal RNA (SSU rRNA, 16s rRNA) has proven useful, and the tree (as shown in the picture) relies heavily on information from this single gene.

These three domains of life represent the main evolutionary lineages of early cellular life and currently include Bacteria, Archaea (single-celled organisms superficially similar to bacteria), and Eukarya. Eukarya includes only organisms having a well-defined nucleus, such as fungi, protists, and all organisms in the plant and animals kingdoms (see figure).

The gene most commonly used for constructing phylogenetic relationships in microorganisms is the small subunit ribosomal RNA  gene, as its sequences tend to be conserved among members with close phylogenetic distances, yet variable enough that differences can be measured.

The SSU rRNA as a measure of evolutionary distances was pioneered by Carl Woese when formulating the first modern "tree of life", and his  results led him to propose the Archaea as a third domain of life. However, recently it has been argued that SSU rRNA genes can also be horizontally transferred.  Although this may be rare, this possibility is forcing scrutiny of the validity of phylogenetic trees based on SSU rRNAs.

Recent discoveries of "rampant" HGT in microorganisms, and the detection of horizontal movement of even genes for the small subunit of ribosomal RNA, have forced biologists to question the accuracy of at least the early branches in the tree, and even question the validity of trees as useful models of how early evolution occurs. In fact, early evolution is considered to have occurred starting from a community of progenotes, able to exchange large molecules when HGT was the standard. This lateral gene transfer occurred also beyond the Darwinian threshold, after heredity or vertical gene transfer was established.
"Sequence comparisons suggest recent horizontal transfer of many genes among diverse species including across the boundaries of phylogenetic "domains". Thus determining the phylogenetic history of a species can not be done conclusively by determining evolutionary trees for single genes." HGT is thus a potential confounding factor in inferring phylogenetic trees from the sequence of one gene. For example, if two distantly related bacteria have exchanged a gene, a phylogenetic tree including those species will show them to be closely related even though most other genes have diverged substantially. For this reason it is important to use other information to infer phylogenies, such as the presence or absence of genes, or, more commonly, to include as wide a range of genes for analysis as possible.

Choice of metaphor: tree, net, cobweb, or ring
In his article Uprooting the Tree of Life, W. Ford Doolittle discusses the Last Universal Common Ancestor – the root of the Tree of Life – and the problems with that concept posed by HGT. He describes the microorganism Archaeoglobus fulgidus as an anomaly with respect to a phylogenetic tree based upon the code for the enzyme HMGCoA reductase – the organism is definitely an archaean, with all the cell lipids and transcription machinery  expected of an archaean, but its HMGCoA genes are of bacterial origin. In the article, Doolittle says that while it is now widely accepted that mitochondria in eukaryotes derived from alpha-proteobacterial cells and that chloroplasts came from ingested cyanobacteria,

".. it is no longer safe to assume that those were the only lateral gene transfers that occurred after the first eukaryotes arose. Only in later, multicellular eukaryotes do we know of definite restrictions on horizontal gene exchange, such as the advent of separated (and protected) germ cells...

If there had never been any lateral gene transfer, all these individual gene trees would have the same topology (the same branching order), and the ancestral genes at the root of each tree would have all been present in the last universal common ancestor, a single ancient cell. But extensive transfer means that neither is the case: gene trees will differ (although many will have regions of similar topology) and there would never have been a single cell that could be called the last universal common ancestor..."

Doolittle suggested that the universal common ancestor cannot have been one particular organism, but must have been a loose, diverse conglomeration of primitive cells that evolved together. These early cells, each with relatively few genes, differed in many ways, and swapped their genes freely. Eventually, from these eclectic cells came the three domains of life as we know them today: bacteria, archaea and eukaryote. These domains are now recognizably distinct because much of the gene transfer that still occurs is within these domains, rather than between them. Biologist Peter Gogarten reinforced these arguments, and suggested that the metaphor of a tree does not fit the data from recent genome research, and that biologists should instead use "the metaphor of a mosaic to describe the different histories combined in individual genomes and use [the] metaphor of a net to visualize the rich exchange and cooperative effects of HGT among microbes."

Resolution of uncertainty with phylogenomics

Despite the uncertainties in reconstructing phylogenies back to the beginnings of life, progress is being made in reconstructing the tree of life in the face of uncertainties raised by HGT. The uncertainty of any inferred phylogenetic tree based on a single gene can be resolved by using several common genes or even evidence from whole genomes. One such approach, sometimes called 'multi-locus typing', has been used to deduce phylogenic trees for organisms that exchange genes, such as meningitis bacteria.

Jonathan Eisen and Claire Fraser have pointed out that:
"In building the tree of life, analysis of whole genomes has begun to supplement, and in some cases to improve upon, studies previously done with one or a few genes. For example, recent studies of complete bacterial genomes have suggested that the hyperthermophilic species are not deeply branching; if this is true, it casts doubt on the idea that the first forms of life were thermophiles. Analysis of the genome of the eukaryotic parasite Encephalitozoon cuniculi supports suggestions that the group Microsporidia are not deep branching protists but are in fact members of the fungal kingdom. Genome analysis can even help resolve relationships within species, such as by providing new genetic markers for population genetics studies in the bacteria causing anthrax or tuberculosis. In all these studies, it is the additional data provided by a complete genome sequence that allows one to separate the phylogenetic signal from the noise. This is not to say the tree of life is now resolved – we only have sampled a smattering of genomes, and many groups are not yet touched"

These approaches are enabling estimates of the relative frequency of HGT; the relatively low values that have been observed suggests that the 'tree' is still a valid metaphor for evolution – but the tree is adorned with 'cobwebs' of horizontally transferred genes. This is the main conclusion of a 2005 study of more than 40 complete microbial genomic sequences by Fan Ge, Li-San Wang, and Junhyong Kim. They estimate the frequency of HGT events at about 2% of core genes per genome. Similar whole genome approaches to assessing evolution are also enabling progress in identifying very early events in the tree of life, such as a proposal that eukaryotes arose by fusion of two complete but very diverse prokaryote genomes: one from a bacterium and one from an archaeal cell.

Such a fusion of organisms hypothesis for the origin of complex nucleated cells has been put forward by Lynn Margulis using quite different reasoning about symbiosis between a bacterium and an archaen arising in an ancient consortium of microbes.

The use of horizontal transfer for evolutionary studies 
While HGT is often seen as a challenge for the reconstruction of the tree of life, an alternative view is that oppositely it provides additional valuable information for its reconstruction.

First, for the recipient organism, HGT is a DNA mutation like others, and as such, it can be modeled and used in tree reconstruction and rooting.

Second, it is necessary that the recipient of a gene acquisition by HGT lives at the same time, or at an ulterior time, as the donor. In consequence there is an information on the timing of diversification in HGT. This is all the more remarkable since the principal usual source for dating in the living world, the fossil record, is absent precisely where HGT is abundant, in the microbial world.

Third, it provides information about the extinct biodiversity, because transfers are likely from extinct species.

See also
Horizontal gene transfer
Inferring horizontal gene transfer

References

Further reading
 . One article in a whole issue of the journal Nature Reviews Microbiology largely devoted to HGT.
 
 
  
 
  
 
 
 
 
 

Genetics
Evolutionary biology